Varjushan (also Romanized as Varjūshān and Warjushān; also known as Vardzhushan) is a village in Howmeh Rural District, in the Central District of Khodabandeh County, Zanjan Province, Iran. At the 2006 census, its population was 708, in 139 families.

References 

Populated places in Khodabandeh County